Ethel Jane Cain (1 May 1909 – 19 September 1996) was a British telephonist and the original voice of the speaking clock in the United Kingdom. She was appointed in 1936 following a "search for the Girl with the Golden Voice". Her voice was used from 1936 until 1963, when it was replaced by Pat Simmons. She also made a record for the GPO helping other staff improve their speaking voice and went on to become announcer for Henry Hall during one of his broadcast concerts. She was later offered a film part by Columbia Pictures under the name of Jane Cain.

Originally the speaking clock was accessed by dialing 846, spelling out the letters T-I-M, on the telephone dial in 'Director Area' (London, Birmingham, Edinburgh, Glasgow, Liverpool & Manchester) and 952 as it was introduced elsewhere in the UK. Later the code on non-director exchanges became 80 and then 8081 before finally becoming standardised everywhere as 123, away from the numbering ranges used by subscribers.

In the mid to late 1950s, she was a member of Perth Repertory Theatre Company.

Her only known big screen role was the lead in the 1935 film, Vanity. She is also credited with small roles in the TV series Starr and Company (1958) and Thirty-Minute Theatre (1961).

Her voice lives on as the voice of the virtual operator on C*NET, a worldwide network of old telephone exchanges preserved by collectors which uses a voice recognition system when '0' or '100' are dialled for the 'operator'.

See also 
 Speaking clock
 Pat Simmons, second permanent voice
 Brian Cobby, third permanent voice
 Lenny Henry, comedian, temporary voice
 Alicia Roland, 12-year-old schoolgirl, temporary voice
 Sara Mendes da Costa, fourth permanent voice

References

External links 
 Telecommunications Heritage Group
 
  Includes video clips of Jane Cain.

1909 births
1996 deaths
British voice actresses
Clocks
Telephone voiceover talent
20th-century British actresses